Pier Luigi Loro Piana (born December 1951) is an Italian billionaire businessman.

Early life
He was born in Milan, Italy, the son of Franco Loro Piana. He received a bachelor's degree in economics from Bocconi University in Milan.

Career
In 2013, Pier Luigi Loro Piana and his late brother Sergio sold an 80% stake in the Loro Piana fashion company to the French billionaire Bernard Arnault's LVMH for US$2.6 billion. Pier Luigi owns an estimated 10% stake in the Loro Piana company.

Personal life
He is married with three children, and lives in Milan, Italy.

He hosts the annual Loro Piana Superyacht Regatta, and had a 130-foot yacht, My Song, which was the fourth incarnation of this boat. My Song was lost in a shipping accident while en route from the Caribbean to the Balearic Islands in late May 2019. According to information collected in a luxurious hotel in Positano (that he visits since 2006), he replaced his superyacht with a Maxi Dolphin 51 ft.

References

1951 births
Italian billionaires
Businesspeople from Milan
Living people